Perche en Nocé is a commune in the department of Orne, northwestern France. The municipality was established on 1 January 2016 by merger of the former communes of Colonard-Corubert, Dancé, Nocé (the seat), Préaux-du-Perche, Saint-Aubin-des-Grois and Saint-Jean-de-la-Forêt.

See also 
Communes of the Orne department

References 

Communes of Orne
Populated places established in 2016
2016 establishments in France